Ehner (Luxembourgish: Éiner or Iener) is a village in northwestern Luxembourg.

It is situated in the commune of Saeul and has a population of 32.

Gallery

References 

Villages in Luxembourg